Hentriacontane, also called untriacontane, is a solid, long-chain alkane hydrocarbon with the structural formula CH3(CH2)29CH3. It is the main component of Paraffin wax. 

It is found in a variety of plants, including peas (Pisum sativum), Acacia senegal, Gymnema sylvestre and others, and also comprises about 8–9% of beeswax. It has 10,660,307,791 constitutional isomers.

References

External links 
 Hentriacontane at Dr. Duke's Phytochemical and Ethnobotanical Databases

Alkanes